The Ross-shire Welfare Football Association is a recreational football league operating in the Highlands of Scotland, affiliated to the Scottish Welfare Football Association and the Scottish Football Association.  

Although another association by the same name was originally formed in the late 1950s / early 1960s, the current incarnation was formed in 1982 by James Patullo.

In 2019, with club member numbers dwindling, a switch to amateur status was proposed and seconded by all clubs.

Member clubs 
Four member clubs registered with the Ross-shire Welfare FA for the 2018 season.

Former member clubs include Alness Athletic, Alness United, Aquascot, Black Rock Rovers, BT Manpower / ClientLogic, Contin, Cromarty, Dalmore, Dingwall, Dingwall Vertex, Easter Ross Rovers, Fortrose & Rosemarkie Union, Inver, Invergordon Distillery Ltd, Maitlands Bar, Morven, Pockets, Portmahomack, Railway Hotel, Rigger, Ross-shire Club, Rugby Club, Stags, Tain Thistle, Tain United, Westpoint, Wheel Inn and 3G's.

Champions

References 

Scottish Welfare Football Association
Football governing bodies in Scotland
Football in Highland (council area)
Football leagues in Scotland
1982 establishments in Scotland
Sports organizations established in 1982